The Division of Mernda was an Australian electoral division in the state of Victoria. It was named after the town of Mernda, now a suburb in the City of Whittlesea in the northern suburbs of Melbourne. It originally included the towns of Lilydale and Mitcham, now suburbs, and the towns of Seymour and Yea. It was redistributed on 13 July 1906 to include the towns of Gisborne and Kyneton. The division was proclaimed in 1900, and was one of the original 65 divisions to be contested at the first federal election. It was abolished at the redistribution of 1 February 1913.

Members

See also
 Electoral results for the Division of Mernda

1901 establishments in Australia
Constituencies established in 1901
Mernda